Little Annie Rooney is a comic strip launched in 1927.

Little Annie Rooney may also refer to:

 Little Annie Rooney (1925 film), 1925 live-action feature
 Little Annie Rooney (1931 film), 1931 animated short film